The Clare Lancers Set is one of the most popular dances in the Irish Set Dancing repertoire. As the name suggests it hails from the Clare area on the mid-west coast of the Republic of Ireland. Other published instructions for this dance include Larry Lynch's Set Dances of Ireland, Terry Moylan's Irish Dances, Pat Murphy's Toss the Feathers and Tom Quinn's Irish Dancing. Joe O'Hara and the Newcastle Irish Set Dancers have versions this set online.

Formation
Square Set of four couples, Gents on the left of their partners. 1st Top Couple have their backs to the band, with 2nd Top Couple opposite them. 1st Side Couple are on the left of 1st Top Couple (when facing into the set) and 2nd Side Couple are opposite them (to the right of 1st Tops).

Steps
Traditionally the figures are danced with smooth flowing steps pushing flat along the floor and minimal heel lift.

Dance Instructions

Figure 1: Reels 160 bars

Figure 2: Reels 192 bars

Figure 3: Reels 144 bars

Figure 4: Reels 192 bars

Figure 5: Reels 192 bars
In this dance at the end of the Chain the Couples line up forming a Column of 8 dancers with each Lady in front of her Partner in the following order: 1st the Dancing Couple / 2nd the Couple on their left / 3rd the Couple on their right / 4th the Couple opposite - All facing out from the Dancing Couples place.

Notes
Big Christmas (Basket):
Place your Right arm around the waist of the person on your right at the level of the small of the back.
Place your Left hand over the right arm of the person on your left clasping the right wrist of the next person.
To Basket left put your right foot in the centre with the knee bent slightly. In effect you will hop on this foot pushing with the other foot placed behind.
To Basket right reverse the feet.

References
Lynch, Larry (1991). Set Dances of Ireland: Tradition and Evolution. California: Séadna Books.
Moylan, Terry (1985). Irish Dances. Dublin: Na Píobaairí Uilleann. 13–18.
Murphy, Pat (1995). Toss the Feathers. Cork: Mercier Press. 90–92.
Quinn, Tom (1977). Irish Dancing. Glasgow: Harper Collins. 108–113.

Web versions of this set
Joe O'Hara's Irish Set Dancing website
Arthur Kingsland's Newcastle Irish Set Dancers website
Additional notes and video links for Clare Lancers on DanceMinder

Irish dances
Irish set dance